Mirifica may refer to :

Biology
Capparis mirifica is a species of plant in the family Capparaceae.
Melibe mirifica is a species of sea slug, a marine gastropod mollusk in the family Tethydidae.
Lewinia mirifica is a species of bird in the family Rallidae.
Pueraria mirifica is a plant found in northern and north eastern Thailand and Myanmar.

Religion
Inter Mirifica is the Second Vatican Council's Decree on the Media of Social Communications.